The Migdale Hospital is a health facility in Bonar Bridge, Scotland. It is managed by NHS Highland.

History  
The facility has its origins in the Sutherland Combination Poorhouse which was designed by Andrew Maitland and completed in 1865. It joined the National Health Service as the Sworedale Institution in 1948. It was replaced by a modern facility, located closer to Bonar Bridge, which was designed by Austin-Smith:Lord and built by Robertson Construction at a cost of £8 million. It opened to patients in June 2011 and was officially opened by Michael Matheson, Minister for Public Health, in August 2012. In 2020 services were reconfigured.

References 

NHS Highland
Hospitals in Highland (council area)
NHS Scotland hospitals
Hospital buildings completed in 2011
Hospitals established in 1865
1865 establishments in Scotland